The Battle of Hosn was a one-day battle during the Syrian Civil War around the village of Hosn and its proper center in the 900-year-old medieval Crusader castle of Krak des Chevaliers, a UNESCO world heritage site, that had been in the hands of rebel fighters along with Hosn itself since 2012. The Syrian Army's objective during the battle was to sever the rebels' supply routes for recruits and weapons coming in and out of Lebanon.

On the morning of 20 March, fighting started around early dawn with a heavy bombardment of the medieval castle where 300 rebels were believed to reside. The town of Hosn itself was also shelled. According to an opposition activist, an agreement for safe conduct of the rebels to Lebanon had been reached the previous day. The military commander leading the battle denied that an agreement had been reached. He stated the military had refused to grant the rebels holed up in the castle safe conduct from the fortress and made the final push into it after seeing the rebels retreating. Another opposition activist countered with claims the military ambushed individuals fleeing Hosn, near the Lebanese border, leaving many dead. Government troops took the castle by the early afternoon. 12 rebel fighters were killed in the engagement inside the castle, including Abu Suleiman Dandashi, an Ahrar ash-Sham brigade commander and Lebanese national. According to military sources, 40–93 rebels were killed as they retreated, including Khaled al-Mahmud, purported to be the leader of the jihadist Jund ash-Sham rebel group. Several soldiers were also killed in the fighting.

After the capture of Hosn and the castle, the Army announced that it had regained full control of the western part of the Homs Governorate.

See also

References 

Military operations of the Syrian civil war in 2014
Military operations of the Syrian civil war involving the al-Nusra Front
Military operations of the Syrian civil war involving the Free Syrian Army
Military operations of the Syrian civil war involving the Syrian government
Military operations of the Syrian civil war involving Hezbollah
Homs Governorate in the Syrian civil war
March 2014 events in Syria
Battles of the Syrian civil war